Frontenay-Rohan-Rohan is a commune in the Deux-Sèvres department, Nouvelle-Aquitaine region, western France.

It is located 10 km south of Niort on the route to La Rochelle. It has 2,833 inhabitants (2018).

See also
Communes of the Deux-Sèvres department

References

Communes of Deux-Sèvres

County of Saintonge